Voznesenovka is a rural locality (a selo) in Tarbagataysky District, Republic of Buryatia, Russia. The population was 413 as of 2010. There are 15 streets.

Geography 
Voznesenovka is located 30 km north of Tarbagatay (the district's administrative centre) by road. Nizhny Sayantuy is the nearest rural locality.

References 

Rural localities in Tarbagataysky District